Wamp'arqucha (Quechua wamp'ar tripod, Wamp'ar a neighboring mountain qucha lake, "tripod lake" or "Wamp'ar lake", hispanicized spelling Huamparcocha) is a lake in Peru located in the Lima Region, Huarochiri Province, Carampoma District. It lies northeast of Wachwaqucha at a mountain named Wamp'ar.

See also
List of lakes in Peru

References

Lakes of Peru
Lakes of Lima Region